Belle Oceanne Iradukunda (born November 11, 1996) is a Rwandan-American actress, film director, writer and model. She was born and raised in Rwanda, and presently lives in Los Angeles, California. Her nickname, Belle, was adopted by her from films such as Living with the Dead, Till Death Do Us Apart, and Shifty Business.

Career 
Iradukunda appeared in a Hollywood comedy-drama TV Series by Tyler Perry titled, Sistas, televised on BET from October 23, 2019, playing the role of a waitress. In 2020, she wrote and directed the film, Thank You for Underestimating Me.

Filmography

Film

Television

Controversies 
In March 2018, The New Times of Rwanda reported the model/actress for accusing the main organizer of the Kigali International Fashion Week, John Bunyeshuli, of an alleged theft of her original concept.

References

External links 
 Belle Oceanne Iradukunda on IMDb
 Oceanne Iradukunda on Stage32
 Bel
 leoceanneofficial on Instagram

1996 births
Living people
Rwandan actresses
Rwandan film directors
Rwandan models
21st-century actresses
Film actresses
Female models
Television actresses
Rwandan women film directors